Edward George Henry Montagu, 8th Earl of Sandwich  KStJ (13 July 1839 – 26 June 1916), styled Viscount Hinchingbrooke until 1884, was a British peer, Conservative politician and author.

Montagu was the eldest son of John William Montagu, 7th Earl of Sandwich, and his wife Lady Mary Paget. Field Marshal Henry Paget, 1st Marquess of Anglesey, was his maternal grandfather. He was elected to the House of Commons for Huntingdon in 1876, a seat he held until 1884, when he succeeded his father in the earldom and took his seat in the House of Lords.

Lord Sandwich was colonel of the Huntingdonshire Militia, and served as Lord Lieutenant of Huntingdonshire between 1891 and 1916. He was appointed a Knight of Grace of the Venerable Order of Saint John of Jerusalem in December 1901.

Lord Sandwich died unmarried in June 1916, aged 76, and was succeeded in the earldom by his nephew George Charles Montagu.

Works
Lord Sandwich was the author of five books:
 Diary in Ceylon & India, 1878-9.  1879
 Hinchingbrooke.  1910
 My Experiences in Spiritual Healing.  1915
 Memoirs  1919
 Memoirs of Edward, Earl of Sandwich, 1839-1916, Ed. 1919 (co-authored with Beatrice Erskine, "Mrs. Steuart Erskine")

References 

Works  worldcat.org Accessed 23 April 2007.
Birth and death information thepeerage.com Accessed 23 April 2007.
Kidd, Charles, Williamson, David (editors). Debrett's Peerage and Baronetage (1990 edition). New York: St Martin's Press, 1990.

External links 
 

1839 births
1916 deaths
Hinchinbroke, Edward Montagu, Viscount
Lord-Lieutenants of Huntingdonshire
Edward Montagu, 8th Earl of Sandwich
Hinchinbroke, Edward Montagu, Viscount
Hinchinbroke, Edward Montagu, Viscount
Sandwich, E8
Earls of Sandwich